Area code 867 is the area code in the North American Numbering Plan (NANP) for the three Canadian territories, all of which are in Northern Canada. The area code was created on October 21, 1997, by combining numbering plan areas (NPAs) 403 and 819.

The numbering plan area is adjacent to eight provinces (Alberta, British Columbia, Manitoba, Newfoundland and Labrador, Ontario, Saskatchewan, and Quebec) and one U.S. state (Alaska), as well as Greenland and Russia (across the North Pole), more jurisdictions than any other area code in North America. It is also one of four Canadian area codes without an overlay numbering plan, the others being 506, 709 (both of which are slated for overlays), and 807.

The incumbent local exchange carrier for area code 867 is Northwestel, a subsidiary of BCE. Until 1964, the geographic area served today by 867 had up to five independent telephone companies, as well as Bell Canada.

History
In 1947, Alberta was assigned area code 403 in the first continent-wide telephone numbering plan by the American Telephone and Telegraph Company (AT&T). When service became available from local telephone companies, Yukon and the west of the Northwest Territories were included in the Alberta numbering plan area. These companies were eventually merged into Canadian National Telecommunications, a subsidiary of the Canadian National Railway. CNT's operations in the territories became Northwestel in 1979.

The eastern Northwest Territories were among the last areas of North America without telephone service. When the area code system was created, the region was nominally part of western Quebec's area code 514. In 1957, those non-diallable areas were nominally shifted to eastern Quebec's area code 418. Bell Canada introduced telephone service in the eastern Northwest Territories in 1958. As direct distance dialing was rolled out in this area in the 1970s, the eastern Northwest Territories and a large swath of northwestern Quebec were shifted to western Quebec's area code 819. Bell Canada sold its northern service territory to Northwestel in 1992.

Until area code 867 was created, area codes 403 and 819 had been geographically the two largest in the North American Numbering Plan. Area code 403 spanned more than one ninth of the planet's circumference, and area code 819 spanned one eighth.

Since the creation of area code 867, all of the former 819 portion of the Northwest Territories, as well as the portion of the former 403 portion covering five exchanges, has become part of Nunavut. Area code 403, covering Alberta, has since been further split to create area code 780 for the northern two thirds of Alberta, including Edmonton.

All existing prefixes stayed the same with the change to 867, with one exception. The conflict between 403 and 979 at Inuvik and 819–979 at Iqaluit was resolved by changing Inuvik from 403–979 to 867–777. A minor programming glitch allowed for a few weeks late in 1997 callers in the Inuvik area to dial 403-777 and reach Inuvik when they actually should have routed to Calgary, which appeared on customer's bills, along with the higher rate.

Northwestel's proposal for a new regulatory regime was approved for 2007 to allow resale of local telephone service, but no competitors entered the market to avail themselves of the resale option. In 2011, facilities-based local service competition was approved by the Canadian Radio-television and Telecommunications Commission (CRTC) and so additional central office codes are now required for competitive carriers wishing to offer local service. The expense limits deployment so far to Whitehorse, Yellowknife, Inuvik, Behchokǫ̀, Aklavik and Hay River, four of which already have multiple prefixes. Communities that now have only one prefix are not likely to need a second prefix other than for local growth or the entry of a competitor (as in Aklavik and the twin Behchokǫ̀ communities, Rae-Edzo*).

The sparsely-populated area is unlikely to exhaust numbers in the foreseeable future. However, in June 2021, the CRTC recommended implementing the three-digit code 9-8-8, which is already in use as a local exchange in the Yellowknife area, as the nationwide number for suicide prevention hotlines, which would imply the need to implement ten-digit dialing in area code 867. The CRTC decision followed the decision of the US Federal Communications Commission to adopt 9-8-8 as the number for the US National Suicide Prevention Lifeline. In August 2022, the CRTC finalized its implementation plans for 9-8-8, effective November 30, 2023; it accepted a request from Northwestel to make ten-digit dialing mandatory only in the Yellowknife area and optional elsewhere within the region as of May 31, 2023, in part because it would ease the process of communicating the transition to remote communities and in Indigenous languages.

* Behchokǫ̀ has two separate exchange areas, each with its own prefix, but Iristel's 292 prefix is overlaid, with both using independent facilities.

Numbering plan area
Area code 867 is the most expensive geographic calling area in Canada. Iristel (the one major CLEC in the region) bills its subscribers in other area codes a 15¢/minute premium to call 1-867 numbers and charges a $20/year premium to issue a 1-867 number in-region instead of assigning the same subscriber any other Canadian area code.

The digits were reportedly chosen to promote the theme "TOP of the world", as 867 spells TOP on a standard North American keypad. When combined with the NANP international dialing code 1, it spells 1867, which is the year of Canadian Confederation.

It has the largest land area of any area code in the NANP. Four different official time zones are observed within the area: Eastern, Central, Mountain, and Pacific.

Exchanges
Area code 867 covers all points in the three Canadian territories, the Northwest Territories, Nunavut, and Yukon

Some exchanges in the territories serve some customers in Fraser and Swan Lake, British Columbia (from Carcross and Swift River, respectively). Fitzgerald, Alberta, is served from Fort Smith, Northwest Territories.

 Aklavik, NT: 375, 978
 Arctic Bay, NU: 439
 Arviat, NU: 205, 232, 341, 857
 Baker Lake, NU: 793
 Beaver Creek, YT: 362 862
 Behchokǫ̀, NT: 292, 371, 392, 492, 731
 Cambridge Bay, NU: 391 983
 Cape Dorset, NU: 897
 Carcross, YT: 733, 821
 Carmacks, YT: 385, 863
 Chesterfield Inlet, NU: 898
 Clyde River, NU: 924
 Colville Lake, NT: 709, 722
 Coral Harbour, NU: 925
 Dawson City, YT: 730, 991, 992, 993
 Délı̨nę, NT: 589, 744
 Destruction Bay, YT: 789, 841
 Ekati Diamond Mine, NT: 880
 Elsa, YT: 995
 Enterprise, NT: 984
 Faro, YT: 746 994
 Fort Good Hope, NT: 496, 598
 Fort Liard, NT: 770
 Fort McPherson, NT: 377, 952
 Fort Providence, NT: 373, 699
 Fort Resolution, NT: 376, 394
 Fort Simpson, NT: 695
 Fort Smith, NT: 621, 870, 872
 Gamèti, NT: 365, 997
 Gjoa Haven, NU: 360
 Grise Fiord, NU: 980
 Haines Junction, YT: 323, 634
 Hall Beach, NU: 928
 Hay River, NT: 775, 874, 875, 876
 Igloolik, NU: 201, 324, 934
 Inuvik, NT: 620, 678, 768, 777, 888
 Iqaluit, NU: 202, 222, 223, 794, 877, 974, 975, 979
 Jean Marie River, NT: 491, 809
 Kakisa, NT: 493, 825
 Kimmirut, NU: 939
 Kugaaruk, NU: 769
 Kugluktuk, NU: 982
 Łutselk'e, NT: 370, 785
 Marsh Lake, YT: 660
 Mayo, YT: 383, 996
 Nahanni Butte, NT: 364, 602
 Nanisivik, NU: 436
 Norman Wells, NT: 587
 Old Crow, YT: 325, 966
 Pangnirtung, NU: 473
 Paulatuk, NT: 580, 788
 Pelly Crossing, YT: 537
 Pond Inlet, NU: 899
 Qikiqtarjuaq, NU: 927
 Rankin Inlet, NU: 645
 Naujaat, NU: 462
 Resolute, NU: 252
 Ross River, YT: 747 969
 Sachs Harbour, NT: 690, 786
 Sambaa Kʼe, NT: 206
 Sanikiluaq, NU: 266
 Swift River, YT: 851
 Tagish, YT: 399 748
 Taloyoak, NU: 561
 Teslin, YT: 384, 390
 Tsiigehtchic, NT: 490, 953
 Tuktoyaktuk, NT: 340, 977
 Tulita, NT: 374, 588
 Ulukhaktok, NT: 396, 787
 Watson Lake, YT: 536, 749
 Wekweeti, NT: 713 745
 Whale Cove, NU: 896
 Whatì, NT: 494, 573
 Whitehorse, YT: 322, 332, 333, 334, 335, 336, 337, 393, 455, 456, 457, 465, 466, 467, 469,                         470, 471, 632, 633, 667, 668, 689 
 Wrigley, NT: 495, 581
 Yellowknife, NT: 200, 444, 445, 446, 447, 669, 675, 676, 677, 679, 680, 681, 682, 688, 765, 766, 767, 783, 873, 920, 988, 999
 Premium numbers: 1+867-976.

Ellesmere Island is the northernmost terrestrial point in Canada. On Ellesmere, conventional telephony is available at Grise Fiord (1-867-980-xxxx), population 130, but not at two remote government outposts further north: Eureka, Nunavut (80.1°N) is host to an Environment Canada weather station and Alert, Nunavut (82°N) is a Canadian Forces Station. The only outside communication to Eureka is via satellite; the weather station lists various extensions of an Ottawa 613 federal number, an Iridium satellite phone or the Winnipeg 204 number of a main Environment Canada office. As Eureka is at the northern limit of access to geosynchronous satellite signals, a string of military terrestrial UHF links extends the signal from "Fort Eureka" to CFS Alert. There is a skeleton crew at each location which is reachable by Internet or telephone, but these links are satellite or military communication and do not use the area code 867 infrastructure.

See also

Area code 600, a rarely used non-geographic prefix which includes caller-pays satellite telephony in the high Arctic
 Telephone numbers in Canada
 Canadian Numbering Administration Consortium

References

External links
CNA exchange list for area +1-867
Area code 867 on localcallingguide.com
Natural Resources Canada, Polar Continental Shelf Project - Eureka Weather Station
 Area Code Map of Canada

Communications in Yukon
Communications in the Northwest Territories
Communications in Nunavut
867
1997 establishments in Canada